Jura is a department in the Bourgogne-Franche-Comté region in Eastern France. Named after the Jura Mountains, its prefecture is Lons-le-Saunier. Its subprefectures are Dole and Saint-Claude. In 2019, Jura had a population of 259,199. Its INSEE code is 39. It has a short portion of the border of Switzerland.

History 
Historically, Jura belonged to the Free County of Burgundy, known in French as the Franche-Comté. Dole was the capital until the region was conquered by Louis XIV and the capital was moved to Besançon. Dole is now a sous-préfecture, or sub-prefecture, of Jura.

As early as the 13th century, inhabitants of the southern two-thirds of Jura spoke a dialect of Arpitan language. It continued to be spoken in rural areas into the 20th century.

Jura is one of the original 83 departments of France, it being created during the French Revolution on 4 March 1790. It was established from part of the former province of Franche-Comté. The prefecture is Lons-le-Saunier.

Demographics 
Population development since 1801:

Principal towns

The most populous commune is Dole; the prefecture Lons-le-Saunier is the second-most populous. As of 2019, there are 5 communes with more than 5,000 inhabitants:

Geography 
Jura is one of eight departments of the Bourgogne-Franche-Comté region and is surrounded by the French departments of Doubs, Haute-Saône, Côte-d'Or, Saône-et-Loire, and Ain, as well as the Swiss canton of Vaud on the east.

The Jura mountains are wooded and rolling, not craggy and rocky like the Alps.

Many lakes can be found throughout the Jura, the largest natural lake being Lac de Chalain, measuring 3 km long and 1 km wide. Lac de Vouglans was formed after the building of a hydro-electric dam. It is one of the largest man-made lakes in France.

Politics

Departmental politics
The President of the Departmental Council has been Clément Pernot (miscellaneous right) since 2015.

Members of the National Assembly
In the 2017 legislative election, Jura elected the following representatives to the National Assembly:

Climate 
The climate of the Jura varies greatly by elevation. The lower valleys are temperate and pleasant, but the high mountain valleys have bitterly cold winters.

Economy 
Jura is a wine-growing region. The Jura wines are very distinctive and unusual wines, such as vin jaune, which is made by a similar process to sherry, developing under a flor of yeast. This is made from the local Savagnin grape variety. Other grape varieties include Poulsard, Trousseau, and Chardonnay.

The department contains no industrial cities: the few towns function as administrative and commercial centres serving Jura's rural economy.   In the absence of large-scale industrial enterprises, small artisanal businesses play an important role.  The Jura CFA (Centre for apprenticeship and training) recently recorded 752 current apprenticeships in trades such as building, baking, butchery, hair dressing, car repairing, sales and other non-factory based occupations.

Tourism 
The Jura mountains provide ample opportunities for hiking, skiing, as well as other winter sports.

See also
Cantons of the Jura department
Communes of the Jura department
Arrondissements of the Jura department

References

External links 

  Prefecture website
  Departmental Council website
  Tourism website
  Tourism Information

 
1790 establishments in France
Departments of Bourgogne-Franche-Comté
States and territories established in 1790